William Clowes (1780–1851) was one of the founders of Primitive Methodism.

Biography
William Clowes was born at Burslem, Staffordshire, on 12 March 1780, son of Samuel Clowes, potter, and of Ann, daughter of Aaron Wedgwood, grandson of Gilbert Wedgwood. He was employed during his early years as a working potter.

For many years Clowes led a dissipated life. He was a fine dancer and aspired to be the premier dancer in the kingdom. On 20 January 1805 he was converted. He soon established a prayer meeting in his own house and led a Wesleyan Methodist class.

Clowes attended the first Primitive Methodist camp-meeting ever held in England, at Mow Cop near Harriseahead on 31 May 1807. He was joined in this meeting by Hugh and James Bourne and others. In October 1808 he preached his trial sermon with the Wesleyan Methodists and was duly appointed a local preacher; but, continuing to associate with the Bournes and to attend camp-meetings, his name was omitted from the preachers' plan in June 1810, and in September his quarterly ticket as a member of the society was withheld from him.

After this he made common cause with the Bournes and James Crawfoot. With them he founded the Primitive Methodist Connexion, and became one of the best-known preachers of the new society. He  worked mainly in northern England, as well as in London and Cornwall, were most successful in adding members to the church. In 1819 he introduced Primitive Methodism to Hull.

In 1821 his evangelizing in Leeds was so successful that Ann Carr, Sarah Ecland and Martha Williams were sent from Hull to join him. These new arrivals caused some problems as they were both popular and undisciplined moving from circuit to circuit as the will took them.

On 10 June 1842 he was placed on the superannuation fund, but still continued his labours as before, and was at his work until a day or two before his decease, which took place, from paralysis, at Hull on 2 March 1851. He was a man of strong common sense and of great mental powers.

One of his daughters married her cousin, John Wedgwood, an Anglican priest.

References

 
 William Clowes collection The John Rylands University Library
 

1780 births
1851 deaths
Converts to Methodism
English Methodists
People from Burslem